Heidi Lynn Gardner (born July 27, 1983) is an American actress, comedian, and writer. Gardner has been a cast member on the NBC sketch comedy series Saturday Night Live since 2017, beginning in season 43, when she debuted as a featured player alongside Luke Null and Chris Redd. Beginning with the show's 45th season in 2019, Gardner and Redd were both promoted to repertory status.

Early life 
Gardner was born and raised in Kansas City, Missouri. She grew up with an older brother, Justin.

Growing up, Gardner worked part-time at the Tivoli Theater, where she did everything "from selling tickets to making popcorn." She later credited the theater as "setting the tone in her life." Gardner was not interested in acting as a child, only performing on stage as a flutist for the school band and doing comedy sketches in school talent shows. Gardner graduated from the all-girls Catholic high school Notre Dame de Sion in 2001. In her senior year, she was voted by her classmates as "Most likely to be a cast member of Saturday Night Live." Upon graduation, Gardner followed in the footsteps of a friend and enrolled at the University of Kansas for two years, before transferring to the University of Missouri. Although she became uninterested in school and often skipped classes, Gardner discovered a fondness for haircutting.

Career 
At the age of 21, Gardner dropped out of college and left Missouri to move to Los Angeles, where she worked at a hair salon for nine years. Prior to the move, she saved up $600 over one summer. She was encouraged by a friend to attend a performance at The Groundlings theatre, where she became inspired to become an actress. Due to her lack of acting experience, Gardner enrolled in community workshops to learn the basics of improvising. Once she was comfortable, Gardner auditioned into the Groundlings basic class and was accepted.

In 2014, Gardner joined the Sunday Company, and a year later, after a promotion to the Main Company, she quit her job as a hairstylist to focus on acting. During that time, she became a voice actress, regularly appearing on animated series such as Bratz, SuperMansion, and Mike Tyson Mysteries. In 2017, Gardner joined the cast of Saturday Night Live (SNL) for its forty-third season.

Following her first year on SNL, Gardner was hired to play the supporting role of Leonor in the Ben Falcone-directed film Life of the Party, alongside Melissa McCarthy. On August 28, 2019, TVLine reported that Gardner would have a guest role on the NBC comedy series Superstore playing Dina Fox's nemesis Colleen who is transferred to Store 1217 after Cloud 9’s Bel-Ridge location gets shut down. In 2019, Gardner made her stage debut in Michael Frayn's Noises Off at The Cape Playhouse in Dennis, Massachusetts.

 
 Recurring characters on Saturday Night Live

 Angel (Every Boxer's Girlfriend from Every Movie About Boxing Ever), a distressed woman who tries to give "Weekend Update's Good News Report," but inevitably derails into melodramatic rants about her boyfriend's dangerous boxing career.
 Bailey Gismert, a teen film critic who gives awkward reviews.
 Brie Bacardi, one half of a shallow couple always on the brink of an argument, who runs a relationship-themed Instagram account with her boyfriend Nico Slobkin (Mikey Day).
 Baskin Johns, a woman who works for Goop and gets worried Gwyneth Paltrow will fire her.
 Mandy, a cousin of a celebrity that shames their movie careers
 Sandy, a joyful cook of a baking reality competition show that is qualified and skilled though she often gets passed over as a winner for more poorly-constructed and eccentric cakes
 Tamra, an intern who pitches Instagram captions for Mattel's Barbie account
 Deidre, one half of a couple who describe their vacation to their friends, naïvely misinterpreting poor experiences as prestigious culture

Personal life 
Gardner is a fan of both Kansas City Chiefs and Kansas City Royals.

Gardner met her husband, Marvel Comics writer Zeb Wells, while she was a member of the Groundlings.

Filmography 
Film

Television

Web

Audio

Stage

Writing credits 
Web

References

External links 

1983 births
Living people
21st-century American actresses
21st-century American comedians
21st-century American women
American film actresses
American impressionists (entertainers)
American sketch comedians
American television actresses
American voice actresses
American women comedians
Actresses from Kansas City, Missouri
Comedians from Missouri